The Castellated and Domestic Architecture of Scotland from the Twelfth to the Eighteenth Century is a book that was published in 5 volumes from 1887 to 1892 by Scottish architects David MacGibbon and Thomas Ross.

The book describes 769 Scottish castles. It includes illustrations and information on the castle's condition.

Gallery

References

1887 non-fiction books
19th century in Scotland
British travel books
Books about Scotland
1880s in Edinburgh
1890s in Edinburgh